The 2009 All-Ireland Senior Camogie Championship—known as the Gala All-Ireland Senior Camogie Championship for sponsorship reasons— is the high point of the 2009 season in the sport of camogie. It commenced on 20 June 2009 and ended with the final on 13 September 2009. Eight teams competed in the Senior Championship out of twenty-seven who competed overall in the Senior, Intermediate and Junior Championships. The final of the 2009 Senior Championship was contested by Cork—the reigning champions—and Kilkenny at Croke Park on 13 September 2009. The final was available to view worldwide. Cork were the champions.

Launch 
The Championship was launched in Croke Park, Dublin on 10 June 2009. Camogie Association of Ireland President Joan O'Flynn said at the launch that the 2009 Championship would be "the highest profile yet". The Camogie Association also announced the use of county grounds for the first time, with the aim of improving attendances and facilities. This led to some debate on the role of women in sport, with Marie O'Halloran of The Irish Times claiming that female athletes were "still playing second fiddle". Camogie county boards were also undecided whether their players would dress in a skirt or shorts—they presently wear "skorts".

Summary 
The eight teams were drawn into two groups of four. Each team played one another once only. The top two in each group contested the semi-finals. Cork went into the 2009 Senior Championship as reigning champions. They began their title challenge by dismissing Dublin. League champions Wexford began their challenge with a game against Limerick in Hospital.

The semi-finals were contested at Nowlan Park, Kilkenny on 15 August 2009. Galway versus Kilkenny and Cork versus Wexford were the semi-finals. Cork and Kilkenny progressed to the final. Kilkenny's victory over Galway was unexpected as 33% of their team was under the age of twenty.

Prior to the final, representatives from both the Minor (Offaly versus Waterford) and Senior Championship finals met President Joan O'Flynn at Croke Park. The teams were named on 10 September 2009. 
The semi-final between Kilkenny and Galway in which Kilkenny produced a late surge to snatch victory deep in injury-time to qualify for their first final since 2001 was described as “one of the most memorable games ever played in Nowlan Park.” 
The final between Cork and Kilkenny was played at Croke Park on 13 September 2009 and was broadcast live in Ireland on RTÉ Two and internationally on RTÉ.ie. Highlights were shown on The Sunday Game in Ireland and worldwide on the same channels. Cork were featuring in their eighth consecutive final, whilst Kilkenny last appeared in the final in 2001 when they lost to Tipperary. Kilkenny last won the final in 1995. The teams had met earlier in the Championship in Group 1 when Cork beat Kilkenny by a scoreline of 2–05 to 0-07.

The Gala Performance Award was awarded the player who topped a public poll as having given the season's best performance.

Fixtures and results

Group A

Group B

Final stages

MATCH RULES
60 minutes
Replay if scores level
Maximum of 5 substitutions

Gala Performance awards 2009
Overall winner: Chloe Morey Clare

 Rachel Moloney Cork
 Anne Griffin Dublin 
 Jacqui Frisby Kilkenny
 Una O'Dwyer Tipperary; 
 Kate Kelly Wexford  
 Breda Hanney Galway 
 Niamh Mulcahy Limerick
 Aoife Murray Cork

Championship statistics

Scoring

Widest winning margin: 21 points
Wexford 5-20 : 0-6 Limerick
Most goals in a match: 5
Wexford 5-20 : 0-6 Limerick
Galway 3-7 : 2-6 Wexford 
Most points in a match: 28 
Cork 3-21 : 1-7 Dublin 
Most goals by one team in a match: 5
Wexford 5-20 : 0-6 Limerick
Most points by one team in a match: 21
Cork 3-21 : 1-7 Dublin

References

External links
 Fixtures and results for the 2009 O'Duffy Cup

2009
2009
All-Ireland Senior Camogie Championship